AD Ports Group  (formerly Abu Dhabi Ports Company and ADPC) is the exclusive developer and regulator of ports and related infrastructure in Abu Dhabi.

History 
Abu Dhabi Ports PJSC was established by Emiri Decree in 2006. Through organic growth and partnerships in 2021 AD Ports Group was established bringing together all subsidiaries as an integrated business across five clusters – Digital, Economic Cities & Free Zones, Logistics, Maritime and Ports.

AD Ports Group was publicly listed on 8th February 2022 (Ticker: ADPORTS on Abu Dhabi Securities Exchange (ADX)). ADQ one of the region's largest holding companies is the majority shareholder.

Subsidiaries/Associated Companies (Clusters) 
AD Ports Group has five integrated business clusters Digital, Economic Cities & Free Zones, Logistics, Maritime and Ports.
Under the supervision of Abu Dhabi's Department of Economic Development, Maqta Gateway have developed and operates the Advanced Trade and Logistics Platform (ATLP) designed to unify trade and logistics services across Abu Dhabi, including sea, land, air, and industrial and free zones.

The Economic Cities & Free Zones Cluster oversees the operations of KEZAD Group the largest integrated trade, logistics and industrial hub in the region. The Cluster provides a hub for manufacturing, logistics and trade with more than 550 km2 of land including 100 km2 designated as Free Zone. In 2021, KEZAD Group Communities was established as an employee accommodation provider.

The Logistics Cluster has local and international clientele. In 2020, AD Ports Group acquired MICCO Logistics expanding into freight forwarding services with a transportation fleet of over 400 vehicles and temperature-controlled warehouses.

The Ports Cluster owns and operates 10 terminals and ports in the UAE. The Ports Cluster has partnerships with local and global partners including ADNOC, COSCO SHIPPING Ports, CMA CGM Group, Mediterranean Shipping Company (MSC) and Autoterminal Barcelona.

The Maritime Cluster provides maritime services through SAFEEN including pilotage, bunkering, harbour tugs and towing, Vessel Traffic Services (VTS), transshipment, offshore and onshore logistics and support. Specialised offshore services are catered for by OFCO and a feedering service through SAFEEN Feeders. Also within the cluster, Abu Dhabi Maritime governs and regulates Abu Dhabi's waters ensuring the implementation of maritime health and safety and maritime education and training for professionals and graduates is provided by Abu Dhabi Maritime Academy.

Governance (Board of Directors) 
The current chairman is H.E. Falah Mohammad Al Ahbabi, Chairman of Abu Dhabi Department of Municipalities and Transport, Member of the Abu Dhabi Executive Council. The other board members are:

Khalifa Sultan Al Suwaidi Board Member Vice Chairman, Chief Executive Officer at Abu Dhabi Growth Fund (ADG); Chairman of Agthia Group.

H.E. Mohamed Ibrahim Al Hammadi Board Member, Managing Director & Chief Executive Officer of the Emirates Nuclear Energy Corporation (ENEC).

Captain Mohamed Juma Al Shamisi, Managing Director and Group CEO, AD Ports Group. Joined in 2008, appointed CEO in 2014. Chairman of Aramex PJSC, ADNEC and KEZAD Group.

Jasim Husain Thabet Board Member, Chief Executive Officer of TAQA; Board Member at EWEC.

Mansour Mohamed Abdulqader Al Mulla Board Member, Managing Director and Chief Executive Officer, EDGE Group.

Najeeba Al Jabri Board Member, Vice President – Technical Midstream of the Emirates Global Aluminium Group.

See also 

 Al Ain
 Abu Dhabi, the capital of the UAE.
 Khalifa Port, Abu Dhabi's dedicated container terminal and the first semi-automated port in the Middle East.
 Musaffah Port, the dedicated port for Abu Dhabi's Musaffah Industrial Zone.
 Zayed Port, the port of Abu Dhabi city.

References 

Abu Dhabi Ports
Government-owned companies of Abu Dhabi
Companies based in Abu Dhabi
Transport companies established in 2006
Emirati companies established in 2006